Freycinetia arborea, Ieie, is a densely branched, brittle, woody climber in the family Pandanaceae, endemic to the Pacific Islands. Ieie is found in moist forest on the Hawaiian, Marquesas, Austral, Society, and Cook Islands. It grows into the forest canopy, attaching itself to a host tree using aerial roots. It may also grow as a sprawling tangle on the forest floor. The shiny green leaves have pointed ends and are spiny on the lower side of the midrib and along the edges. Flowers form on spike-like inflorescences at the end of branches, and are either staminate or pistillate. Pistillate spikes are  but elongate to  once fruit are produced. Three to four spikes are surrounded by orange-salmon bracts. The bracts and fruit of the ieie were a favorite food of the ōū (Psittirostra psittacea), an extinct Hawaiian honeycreeper that was formerly a principal seed dispersal vector for plants with small seeded, fleshy fruits in low elevation forests. It is also a favored food of the alalā (Corvus hawaiiensis), which is currently extinct in the wild.

Uses
Native Hawaiians used ieie to make hīnai hoomoe ia (fish baskets), hīnai hooluuluu (fish traps), and mahiole ie (alii helmets).

See also
 Kiekie - a related species from New Zealand.

References

 

arborea
Flora of the Pacific
Flora of Hawaii
Flora of the Cook Islands